The DNA World Tour is the eleventh concert tour by American vocal group Backstreet Boys in support of their tenth studio album, DNA (2019). The tour will perform over 150 shows in the Americas, Europe, Asia and Australia. It was the ninth highest-grossing tour of 2019, with a total attendance of 999,242 from 95 shows, as well as a total revenue of $92,310,105.

The tour began on May 11, 2019, but was cut short on March 15, 2020, due to the COVID-19 pandemic. They initially rescheduled the remaining dates for 2021, but eventually had to reschedule again for 2022 and 2023.

Background
The DNA World Tour was announced on November 9, 2018. In April 2019, it was announced that member Brian Littrell's son Baylee would be the supporting act for North American tour dates.

Opening act
 KnowleDJ (Europe (most dates))
 Baylee Littrell (North America, select dates)
 Delta Goodrem (North America, select dates)

Set list 
The following set list was obtained from the concert held on August 26, 2019, at the Bridgestone Arena in Nashville, Tennessee. It does not represent all concerts for the duration of the tour.

 "Everyone" / "I Wanna Be With You"
 "The Call"
 "Don't Want You Back"
 "Nobody Else" 
 "New Love"
 "Get Down (You're the One for Me)"
 "Chateau" 
 "Show Me the Meaning of Being Lonely"
 "Incomplete" 
 "Undone"
 "More than That"
 "The Way It Was" 
 "Chances"
 "Shape of My Heart"
 "Drowning"
 "Passionate" 
 "Quit Playing Games (with My Heart)"
 "As Long as You Love Me"
 "No Place"
 "Anywhere For You"
 "Breathe"
 "Don't Wanna Lose You Now"
 "I'll Never Break Your Heart"
 "All I Have to Give"
 "Everybody (Backstreet's Back)"
 "We've Got It Goin' On"
 "It's Gotta Be You"
 "That's the Way I Like It"
 "Get Another Boyfriend"
 "The One"
 "I Want It That Way"
Encore
"Don't Go Breaking My Heart"
 "Larger than Life"

Notes 

 The Spanish version of "Anywhere For You" was performed in Latin America except in Brazil.

Reception
Just six hours after tickets went on sale in Abu Dhabi, United Arab Emirates, tickets to the concert for Etihad Arena were all sold out. This became the fastest selling event of their world tour and setting the quickest time to sell out an arena show in the UAE capital

Tour dates

Notes

References

2019 concert tours
2020 concert tours
Backstreet Boys concert tours
Concert tours postponed due to the COVID-19 pandemic
2022 concert tours
2023 concert tours